General Hospital is an American television soap opera that was first broadcast on April 1, 1963. The following is a list of characters that first appear in the show during the 2020s, by order of first appearance. All characters are introduced by the show's executive producer Frank Valentini. Brando Corbin (Johnny Wactor) was introduced in January 2020, as the distant relative of Sonny Corinthos (Maurice Benard). Cyrus Renault (Jeff Kober) made his first appearance in February 2021, as an antagonist to Benard's Sonny. Portia Robinson (Brook Kerr) debuted in March 2020 as the mother of Trina Robinson and is later employed at General Hospital. In 2021, the characters of Austin Gatlin-Holt (Roger Howarth), Esme Prince (Avery Kristen Pohl) and Marshall Ashford (Robert Gossett) were introduced. The characters of Rory Cabrera (Michael Blake Kruse) and Cody Bell (Josh Kelly) were introduced in March and June 2022, respectively. Additionally, multiple other characters appear throughout the decade.

Brando Corbin
Brando Corbin, portrayed by Johnny Wactor, made his first appearance on January 30, 2020. The casting was announced on January 25 of the same year. In July 2022, Wactor was let go from the soap, and made his final appearance on September 20.

Cyrus Renault

Cyrus Renault, portrayed by Jeff Kober, made his first appearance on February 5, 2020.

In January 2020, Sonny Corinthos receives news a truck containing a shipment of coffee had been stolen, with the truck subsequently found abandoned and burned. While in Brooklyn, New York with his father, Mike and enforcer, Jason Morgan, the three are ambushed in a restaurant by armed gunmen. Simultaneous to this, two additional ambushes occur in Port Charles - one at Sonny's coffee warehouse, endangering Gladys Corbin and Carly Corinthos, and the other at the pier, threatening Michael Corinthos, Josslyn Jacks, Sasha Gilmore and Laura Collins. Laura is shot in the stomach during the Pier ambush, while the others were saved after Dustin Phillips fought off the gunman. Meanwhile, at the warehouse, Brando Corbin arrived and was able to rescue Gladys and Carly. In Brooklyn, Jason was able to fend off their attacker, while Sonny focused on keeping an agitated Mike calm. Following the skirmish at the warehouse, two of Sonny's men were able to capture one of the attackers, who after being interrogated, attempting escape, and being shot by Jason, reveals the name of his employer - Cyrus Renault.

Renault is revealed to be drug runner, who typically operates out of the Pacific Northwest, but has recently been transferred to Pentonville Penitentiary outside of Port Charles. Sonny opts to pay him a visit, during which Cyrus attempts to entice him into running drugs with him, which Sonny refuses. Parallel to this, it is revealed that Police Commissioner Jordan Ashford once worked as part of a DEA task force alongside Marcus Taggert and two other agents to take down Renault. The two other agents have recently been found dead, with it made to seem as if they died of drug overdoses. Jordan had infiltrated Cyrus's organization and taken a place as his right-hand when her team had manufactured evidence to incriminate Cyrus, resulting in his imprisonment. Cyrus denies any responsibility in the deaths of the other agents.

Jason discovers the location of a warehouse owned by Renault, which he arranges to have blown up.

Portia Robinson
Portia Robinson, portrayed by Brook Kerr, made her first appearance on March 5, 2020. Her casting was announced on February 26, 2020, with Portia being introduced as a doctor, who is also the mother of Trina Robinson (Sydney Mikayla).

Speaking to Soap Opera Digest, Kerr called the role a "blessing," and discussed the audition process, stating it "came out of the blue and when it did, I was like, 'Yes! This is perfect!'" She further discussed her luck of working with several of the soap's cast members, revealing: "A lot of these cast members, I've been a fan of for a long time. The fact that I'm kind of in the middle of it now is so amazing! I'm just really enjoying the ride and I'm so happy to be a part of this team now."

Austin Gatlin-Holt
Austin Gatlin-Holt, portrayed by Roger Howarth, made his first appearance on May 27, 2021. Prior to his debut, Howarth previously portrayed the roles of Todd Manning (2012–2013) and Franco Baldwin (2013–2021). Following the exit of Franco, Howarth spoke out about his status with the soap and his future, stating: "I'm really excited. I have great faith in the people who think of these things. I've been in good hands so far." Speaking on his debut of Austin, he remarked: "I love what I do and I was glad to get back to it — but there's a certain amount of nervous energy that showed up."

In a subsequent June 2021 interview with Soap Opera Digest, Howarth described himself as "in the approach" of Austin. He further explained: "In terms of figuring it out, what's been really kind of fun is that as soon as I think I have it figured out, I'm reminded that I just don't. So there's been some trial and error. I'm learning to juggle and sometimes I drop the ball. But I have a lot of support; [Co-Head Writers] Chris [Van Etten] and Dan [O'Connor] have a lot of great ideas and Frank [Valentini, executive producer] has chimed in with what he needs, and so for me, at the risk of overusing ‘juggling exercises’, I am trying to juggle a lot of different inputs and trying to stay on track and do what’s expected. And it’s been fun. It requires some concentration from me and different parts of my brain that I wasn’t using."

Esme Prince
Esme Prince, played by Avery Kristen Pohl, first appeared on August 16, 2021. She is later revealed to be the girlfriend of Spencer Cassadine (Nicholas Chavez). She is the daughter of Ryan Chamberlain (Jon Lindstrom) and Heather Webber (Alley Mills), the maternal half sister of Steven Webber (Scott Reeves) and Franco Baldwin (Howarth), the niece of Kevin Collins, the cousin of Livvie Locke (Kelly Monaco), and the granddaughter of Alice Grant and Victor Collins (Nicholas Pryor). In February 2023, Esme welcomed her first child, Ace Prince-Cassadine, who was conceived from her one-night stand with Spencer's father, Nikolas Cassadine (Adam Huss), who was born at Wyndemere Castle with the help of his grandmother, Laura Webber (Genie Francis) and his great-uncle, Kevin.

Marshall Ashford
Marshall Ashford, portrayed by Robert Gossett, made his first appearance on October 18, 2021. Initially a recurring cast member, Gossett was upgraded to regular status as of April 2022.<ref name="Soap Opera Network 1">{{cite web |last=Lewis |first=Errol |title=Gregory Harrison Upped to Contract Status at ';'General Hospital |url=https://www.soapoperanetwork.com/2022/06/gregory-harrison-upped-to-contract-status-at-general-hospital |website=Soap Opera Network |access-date=June 20, 2022 |location=United States |date=June 13, 2022}}</ref>

In October 2021, a mysterious man arrives in Port Charles, and begins taking an interest in both Curtis Ashford (Donnell Turner) and his nephew, TJ Ashford (Tajh Bellow). Initially suspecting him to be connected to Cyrus, Curtis later confronts him at which point the man introduces himself as Marshall Ashford, Curtis's presumed dead father. Curtis attempts to pursue answers about Marshall's whereabouts over the decades; Marshall is evasive, only indicating he stayed away to keep his family safe.

Rory Cabrera
Rory Cabrera, portrayed by Michael Blake Kruse, made his first appearance on March 29, 2022. His casting was first announced the day prior on March 28. Rory is introduced as the newest recruit hired at the Port Charles Police Department.

Cody Bell

Cody Bell, portrayed by Josh Kelly, made his first appearance on June 1, 2022. Deadline Hollywood announced Kelly's casting on May 11 of the same year. He is the son of Mac Scorpio (John J. York) and Dominique Baldwin (Shell Danielson), the maternal half brother of Serena Baldwin (Carly Schroeder), the nephew of Robert Scorpio (Tristan Rogers) and the cousin of Robin Scorpio (Kimberly McCullough).

Cody has been billed as a character that would "greatly affect the lives of Sam (Monaco), Dante (Dom Zamprogna) and Britt (Kelly Thiebaud)." In an interview with Soap Opera Digest'', Kelly detailed his joining the role, stating: "I was excited and nervous. I haven't done this much dialogue in this short of an amount of time, but that's the challenge and it's one of the reasons I wanted to do this. It's a good work routine, and I think it's good for your mind and your body. I came in for a Covid test on a Thursday, did a wardrobe fitting on a Friday and then on Monday, I was working – out of the frying pan and into the fire!"

Other characters

References

Lists of General Hospital characters
, General Hospital
, General Hospital
, General Hospital
, General Hospital